Live, styled as Live!, is a live extended play by Australian rock band, Roxus. Its four tracks were recorded at Billboards Club, Melbourne in March 1990 and released in June that year. It peaked at number 33 on the ARIA Singles Chart.

Track listing

Vinyl / CD/ Cassette (D10118)
 "That Girl" (Juno Roxas, Dragan Stanić, Gleeson)
 "Body Heat" (Roxas, Joe Cool)
 "Morning Light" (Roxas, Cool)
 "Stand Back" (Roxas, Cool, Jim Faraci)

Chart performance

References

External links

 Live! by Roxus

1990 EPs
Roxus albums
Live EPs
EPs by Australian artists
Live albums by Australian artists